The 2013–14 Austrian Football Bundesliga was the 102nd season of top-tier football in Austria.

Licensing procedures
On 30 April 2013, the Bundesliga awarded the licenses for the 2013–14 championship. Only 18 out of the 24 clubs that had applied for a license were granted. The Bundesliga teams FC Admira Wacker Mödling and FC Wacker Innsbruck, the First League clubs First Vienna FC and TSV Hartberg, as well as the regional league teams LASK Linz and SV Austria Salzburg were denied the license. First league team SKN St. Pölten received the license through financial conditions. FC Lustenau 07, who had to forcibly withdraw from the First League due to multiple violations of the licensing procedure, did not apply for the license.

All six clubs, which were denied the license in the first place, filed a complaint with the protest committee of the Bundesliga. The protest of the Hartberger team was granted; as well as the protests of FC Admira Wacker Mödling, FC Wacker Innsbruck and First Vienna FC, the latter only under financial conditions. In addition, Vienna was deducted five points for the 2013–14 season for violations of the license terms and conditions.

Division
The Bundesliga, which is sponsored by tipp3 as the main sports sponsor, is the highest division in Austrian football and was played for the 40th time in the 2013–14 season and determined the 102nd Austrian Football Champion. Subsponsor was the mobile provider T-Mobile Austria, which is why the official league designation was tipp3-Bundesliga powered by T-Mobile.

Lower Austria, Salzburg and Vienna each have two clubs, and Carinthia, Upper Austria, Styria and Tyrol each one club. The Burgenland and Vorarlberg are not represented with any team in Austria's highest league. In the pre-season, the SV Mattersburg went down to the First League, and SV Grödig took their place.

The TV provider Sky Germany AG had the rights to show all Bundesliga games in full-length which were broadcast on the Sky sport Austria pay television channel. The channel broadcast all games as conference calls and  individually.  In addition, the ORF had the rights to broadcast a game of their choice, which was as a single match labeled the "top match of the round" – which usually took place  Sundays, when the midweek rounds were on Wednesdays. This was not possible though in the last two rounds where  all games had to be broadcast simultaneously. In addition, the ORF was allowed to show a 45-minute summary of the remaining four games of each round.

Mode
In the 2013–14 season ten clubs will compete against each other in 36 rounds, as in previous years. Each team plays twice at home and away against each other team.

Due to the bad European Cup results of the Austrian teams in the 2012–2013 season, Austria felt to 16th place in the UEFA five-year ranking at the end of that season. This meant that there was only one place for the UEFA Champions League and three places for the Europa League in the 2013–14 Bundesliga and Cup season. The champions of the Bundesliga was eligible to take part in the UEFA Champions League qualification and would  enter the 2nd or 3rd qualifying round, depending on whether the defending champions spot was used; The second and third placed clubs played in the qualification for the UEFA Europa League, where they entered the second round. The Cup winner took part in the 3rd qualifying round of the Europa League. The last place in the highest division has to go down to the second-class First League.

Stadia and locations

League table

Results
Teams play each other four times in this league. In the first half of the season each team plays every other team twice (home and away) and then do the same in the second half of the season, for a total of 36 games

First half of season

Second half of season

Top goalscorers

References

External links
 Bundesliga website 

Austrian Football Bundesliga seasons
Austrian Football Bundesliga
1